Blood Will Out may refer to:
 A Diagnosis: Murder episode
 A Midsomer Murders episode
 Blood Will Out (memoir) is a non-fiction work by Walter Kirn about his friendship with Christian Gerhartsreiter, AKA Clark Rockefeller